Shahrak-e Darjetan Ebrahimi (also Romanized as Shahrak-e Darjetān Ebrāhīmī; also known as Ebrāhīmī and Shahrak-e Darjenān Ebrāhīmī) is a village in Isin Rural District, in the Central District of Bandar Abbas County, Hormozgan Province, Iran. At the 2006 census, its population was 113, in 37 families.

References 

Populated places in Bandar Abbas County